The TVB Anniversary Award for Most Popular Male Character is one of the TVB Anniversary Awards presented annually by Television Broadcasts Limited (TVB) to recognize an actor who has delivered a popular performance in a Hong Kong television drama role throughout the designated year. The My Favourite Male Television Role (我最喜愛的電視男角色) was not introduced to the awards ceremony until 2006, nine years after its establishment. In 2013, the name was changed to Most Popular Male Television Role (最受歡迎電視男角色).

The original equivalent of the award was called My Favourite Television Roles of the Year (本年度我最喜愛的電視角色), which was created in 2003. The award was given to 12 winners for both actors and actresses. In 2006, the award was divided into two separate gender categories and reduced to one specific winner.

Winners and nominees

TVB nominates at least ten actors for the category each year. The following table lists only the actors who have made it to the top five nominations during the designated awards ceremony. There were no top five nominations from 2012 to 2014.

2000s

2010s

2020s

Records
Most wins

Most top 5 nominations

Age superlatives

See also
 List of Asian television awards

External links
 Anniversary Awards  myTV SUPER

TVB Anniversary Awards